Mangesh Tendulkar was an Indian artist as cartoonist and humourist. He has also written in many magazines on cartoons.

Early life

Brief biography
Tendulkar was a caricaturist for the year 1954. He was instrumental in creating traffic awareness in Pune city and gave great support to Pune traffic police. He used to personally stand on Karve road, Pune for creating awareness regarding the traffic for last 17 years of his life.

TThe city-based Automotive Research Association of India (ARAI) had used Mangesh’s talents to draw images in their drive to promote road safety. In a series of 100 cartoons, he set forth his concerns about the city and the preservation of Pune’s once-leafy environs with his trademark good-humoured, gentle skepticism. Besides his prolific cartoons, Tendulkar also authored collections of satirical sketches accompanied by his caricatures in works like Bhuichakra and Sunday Mood. He also documented Pune’s theatre scene in incisive articles and books.

He started sketching caricatures in his 70s and he was active till his death.

Books
Tendulkar’s book named Cartoons was published in 2001.

 Cartoons
 Bhuichakra भुईचक्र
 Sunday Mood संडे मूड : (५३ लेख आणि जवळपास तेवढीच व्यंगचित्रे असलेले पुस्तक)
 Atikraman अतिक्रमण
 Kuni Pampato Ajun Kalokh कुणी पंपतो अजून काळोख
 Bittesha Dakesha ’बित्तेशां?’ ‘दांकेशां!’

Apart from that, he had written in various magazines regarding cartoons:

Exhibitions
In total, 89 exhibitions have seen Tendulkar's cartoons placed.

Awards
 1980 - President’s medal 
 1993 - Marathi Natya Parishad Award 
 2003 - Pulotsav award
 1984 - Active theatre award
 Award from Kamayani Pune
 Award from Pune Police for cartoon on Traffic
 Award from Dnyaneshwar Vidhyapeeth
 Award from Samvad TV
 Award from Urja Kotwal Foods
 Award from Maayboli
 2001 - Award in Kothrud Natya Sammelan 
 1994- Award from Mumbai Marathi Patrakar Sangh
 2003 – Award from Muktachand

Family
He was the brother of acclaimed playwright and screenwriter Padma Bhushan Vijay Tendulkar. He was survived by his wife, a son, and a daughter.

Death
Mangesh Tendulkar died on July 10, 2017 in Pune at 83 years of age. Tendulkar was suffering from bladder cancer for the last three years and was admitted to Ruby Hall Clinic, Pune after he complained of pain. He developed a pulmonary embolism and died at around 11 p.m. on Monday.

References 

1934 births
2017 deaths
Indian cartoonists
Indian caricaturists
Journalists from Karnataka
20th-century Indian painters